Hydnellum septentrionale is a tooth fungus in the family Bankeraceae. Found in Michigan, it was described as new to science in 1964 by Canadian mycologist Kenneth A. Harrison.

References

External links

Fungi described in 1964
Fungi of the United States
Inedible fungi
septentrionale
Fungi without expected TNC conservation status